Pantelis Theologou (born 7 May 1991) is a Greek professional footballer who last played as a centre-back.

References

1991 births
Living people
Greek footballers
Super League Greece players
Super League Greece 2 players
Football League (Greece) players
Gamma Ethniki players
Ethnikos Asteras F.C. players
Kallithea F.C. players
Atromitos F.C. players
OFI Crete F.C. players
A.E. Karaiskakis F.C. players
Apollon Pontou FC players
Panachaiki F.C. players
Association football defenders